Elections to the French National Assembly were held in Chad and Ubangi-Shari on 21 October 1945. The territories elected two seats to the Assembly via two electoral colleges. René Malbrant was elected from the first college and Guy de Boissoudy in the second, both of whom were members of the Chadian Democratic Union.

Campaign
World War II had seen Chad become a territory whose primary political sentiment was loyalty to Charles de Gaulle; it had been recognised with numerous accolades for being the first territory to respond to his Appeal of 18 June, and had also been used as a base for Philippe Leclerc de Hauteclocque's desert campaign. As a result, the Gaullist Chadian Democratic Union found it easy to recruit African members, despite its conservative views on African rights. The party put up European candidates for both college seats; Malbrant was a vet and de Boissoudy a colonel.

Results

First College

Second College

References

Chad
Elections in the Central African Republic
1945 in Ubangi-Shari
Chad
Elections in Chad
1945 in Chad
October 1945 events in Africa